In relational database theory, a tuple-generating dependency (TGD) is a certain kind of constraint on a relational database. It is a subclass of the class of embedded dependencies (EDs).

An algorithm known as the chase takes as input an instance that may or may not satisfy a set of TGDs (or more generally EDs) and, if it terminates (which is a priori undecidable), outputs an instance that does satisfy the TGDs.

Definition 
A tuple-generating dependency is a sentence in first-order logic of the form:

A relational atom has the form , where each of the terms  are variables or constants.

Fragments 
Several fragments of TGDs have been defined. For instance, full TGDs are TGDs which do not use the existential quantifier. Full TGDs can equivalently be seen as programs in the Datalog query language.

There are also some fragments of TGDs that can be expressed in guarded logic, in particular:
 in frontier-guarded TGDs (FGTGD), all the variables shared by the body and the head of a rule (called frontier variables) must occur together in some atom;
 guarded TGDs (GTGD) are particular FGTGDs where all variables used in the body of a rule must occur together in some atom;
 linear TGDs (LTGD) are particular GTGDs where whose body consists of a single atom;
 inclusion dependencies (IND) are particular LTGDs where in both the sides of the rule there is only one relational atom.

References

Further reading 
 Serge Abiteboul, Richard B. Hull, Victor Vianu: Foundations of Databases. Addison-Wesley, 1995.
 Alin Deutsch, FOL Modeling of Integrity Constraints, https://web.archive.org/web/20140912044956/http://db.ucsd.edu/pubsFileFolder/305.pdf

Database theory
Logic